Thai Nguyen T&T Women's Football Club is a Vietnam women's football club, based in Thái Nguyên, Vietnam. The team will play in the Vietnam women's football championship.

The team is currently playing at Thái Nguyên Stadium.

History 
The club was founded in 2003 as Thái Nguyên W.F.C. in Thái Nguyên, Vietnam. In 2020, it was acquired by T&T Group, the same company that helped establishing Hanoi FC, the first fully professionalised football club in the men's V.League 1.

Under the investment of T&T Group, the club aimed to become the first fully professionalised women's football club in Vietnam, hoping to influence other men's football clubs in Vietnam as well as aspiring women's clubs to introduce women's professional football teams. Following a year hiatus due to COVID-19 pandemic, in May 2022, the club made headline as they signed three players professional contracts, the first ever professional contracts being signed to female footballers in Vietnam.

Honours

Domestic competitions

League
 Vietnam women's football championship
  Winners (0):

Current squad
As of November 2022

References

 

Women's football in Vietnam